Horamavu is an area in Bangalore in the Indian state of Karnataka. It is a rapidly growing suburb, which is adjacent to other areas such as Banaswadi, Kalkere and Ramamurthy nagar in North Bangalore. The Krishnarajapuram railway station, an important railway junction in Bangalore, is 3 km away. It is about 35 km away from the city's main Kempegowda airport.

Horamavu was initially a village comprising plenty of farm land, mangroves and orchards. It had a very rich and diverse ecosystem, consisting of birds including eagles, pigeons and bats, and bees that helped in pollination. Today, the rampant rise of high rise apartments and schools in the neighbourhood has destroyed all the greenery and endangered species like the bats and bees.

The locality is very good for Working, software and hardware professionals as almost all companies are with in the accessible distance and almost close to central part of the city, also from the point of view of education with the presence of several schools such as St. Vincent Pallotti School, Vibgyor, Deva Matha High School, Narayana Techno and chaitanya techno school , Mehras Educational institute ,Christian group of institutions, Navneetam college of nursing so on. Horamavu is also home to several eatery joints and restaurants such as Adyar Ananda Bhavan, Udupi Sagar and so on. There are several new real estate properties springing up in the area including Prestige, Cumins, and so on. Recently, the new underpass was also inaugurated, easing traffic on the Horamavu main road,  before the underpass on the left hand side you find good residential places like P&T colony Golden Enclave lane, Ashirwad colony are the most preferred as it is walkable to the main road and hardly 500 mts to ring road.

All these make Horamavu a very attractive locality in terms of buying properties and settling down. However, one pressing issue plaguing the locality is the steady degradation of its huge lakes such as Horamavu and Agara lakes. Authorities have promised to launch clean lakes projects.

References 

Neighbourhoods in Bangalore